Trbušnica may refer to:
 Trbušnica (Lazarevac), Serbia
 Trbušnica (Loznica), Serbia